Dreams is an album by Brazilian composer Eloy Fritsch.

AllMusic's Cesar Lanzarini said that Fritsch's debut is "a perfect example of how to combine an infinite quantity of timbres created in different synthesizers and use them as tools to explore human sensations".

Track listing
 "Space Odissey" – 3:47
 "The Motions of Planets" – 3:33
 "Saturn" – 3:46
 "Pity" – 3:11
 "Crystal" – 3:35
 "Electronic Dreams" – 12:14
 "Mystical Ocean" – 9:38
 "The Hall of Imagination" – 3:21
 "Firmament" – 3:34
 "Lost Temple" – 3:46
 "Progressive Concert" – 6:32

References

1996 albums
Eloy Fritsch albums